This is a list of Communist Party of Canada 2019 federal election candidates by riding and province.

Alberta

British Columbia

Manitoba

New Brunswick

Nova Scotia

Ontario

Quebec

References

External links 

 Party website

Communist Party Of Canada
2019